Sonamukhi Assembly constituency is an assembly constituency in Bankura district in the Indian state of West Bengal. It is reserved for scheduled castes.

Overview
As per orders of the Delimitation Commission, No. 258 Sonamukhi Assembly constituency (SC) is composed of the following: Sonamukhi municipality; Sonamukhi community development block; and Belut Rasulpur, Beersingha, Hamirpur, Narayanpur and Patrasayar gram panchayats of Patrasayer community development block.

Sonamukhi Assembly constituency is part of No. 37 Bishnupur (Lok Sabha constituency).

Members of Legislative Assembly

Election results

2016

2011

.# Swing calculated on Congress+Trinamool Congress vote percentages taken together in 2006.

1977-2006
In the 2006 state assembly elections, Niresh Bagdi of CPI(M) won the Sonamukhi assembly seat defeating his nearest rival Dipali Saha of Trinamool Congress. Contests in most years were multi cornered but only winners and runners are being mentioned. Sukhendu Khan of CPI(M) defeated Dipali Saha of Trinamool Congress in 2001. Haradhan Bauri of CPI(M) defeated Pulakesh Saha of Congress in 1996 and Sastidhar Bagdi of Congress in 1991. Sukhendu Khan of CPI(M) defeated Kallol Saha of Congress in 1987, Sasthi Bauri of Congress in 1982 and Kanai Saha of Janata Party in 1977.

1952-1972
Gurupada Khan of Congress won in 1972. Sukhendu Khan of CPI(M) won in 1971 and 1969. K.Saha of Congress won in 1967. The Sonamukhi seat was not there in 1962 and 1957. In independent India's first election in 1952, the Sonamukhi dual seat was won by Shishuram Mandal and Bhabataran Chakrabarty, both of Congress.

References

Assembly constituencies of West Bengal
Politics of Bankura district